Ciceribacter lividus is a nitrogen fixing, Gram-negative, aerobic and motile bacterium from the genus Ciceribacter which has been isolated from rhizosphere soil from the plant Cicer arietinum in Kannivadi, India.

References

External links
Type strain of Ciceribacter lividus at BacDive -  the Bacterial Diversity Metadatabase	

Rhizobiaceae
Bacteria described in 2013